Marijana Lubej (born 21 June 1945) is a Slovenian sprinter. She competed in the women's 100 metres at the 1968 Summer Olympics.

References

1945 births
Living people
Athletes (track and field) at the 1968 Summer Olympics
Slovenian female sprinters
Yugoslav female sprinters
Yugoslav female hurdlers
Olympic athletes of Yugoslavia
Sportspeople from Celje